Provost is a historic home located near Powhatan, Powhatan County, Virginia. The original section was built about 1800, as a -story, three bay, frame dwelling.  It was expanded by an additional three bays in the mid-19th century.  The building housed a general store that operated there from at least 1867 until about 1945, and a post office from 1902 to 1939.  Also on the property are the contributing smokehouse with attached wash house (formerly a blacksmith shop), a corn house and a machine shed.

It was added to the National Register of Historic Places in 1999.

References

Houses on the National Register of Historic Places in Virginia
Federal architecture in Virginia
Houses completed in 1800
Houses in Powhatan County, Virginia
National Register of Historic Places in Powhatan County, Virginia